Robert Jones was a British designer active between 1815 and 1833. His work include chimney pieces for the Royal Pavilion at Brighton, later moved to Buckingham Palace, and various items connected with grand interior design, such a throne dais for Queen Charlotte. and ornate furniture in the Chinese style, which was fashionable the end of the 18th century.

Notes

References

 Harris, John; de Bellaigue, Geoffrey; & Miller, Oliver (1968). Buckingham Palace. London: Nelson. .

19th-century English people
Year of birth unknown
Year of death unknown
British cabinetmakers
English furniture designers
English interior designers